Jenny Worth (born May 6, 1977) is an IFBB fitness & figure competitor from Florida, in the United States. Jenny Worth became a competitive gymnast at the age of 7, and competed until joining the track, cheerleading, cross country running and weight lifting team at Amos P. Godby High School in Tallahassee, Florida. She has the distinction of being the first female member of the weight lifting team, and also was the Senior Homecoming Queen (1995), and was subsequently inducted in the Amos P. Godby Hall of Fame for her accomplishments in the sports arena.

She became an amateur fitness athlete upon graduating high school, and turned pro in 1998. She has worked as a fitness instructor, and personal trainer in Miami with Dodd Romero of Bod by Dodd. In 2010, she moved to the Los Angeles area, where she continues to work as a personal fitness trainer.

Stats 
Height:   5'1"
Weight:   107 lbs.
Measurements:   34-27-36

Competitive history 

2019 Fitness Olympia 9th 
2019 Tampa Pro 1st  Olympia Qualified 
2018 Legions Sports Fest- 3rd 
2018 Fitness Olympia-8th 
2018 Tampa Pro 1st  Olympia Qualified
2018 Chicago Pro 3rd 
2018 Miami Pro 3rd 
2017 Tampa Pro -3rd  after a 14 yr break 
2003 Fitness Olympia - 10th
2002 Fitness Olympia - 3rd
2002 Show of Strength - 3rd
2002 Fitness International - 2nd
2001 Fitness International - 1st
2001 Fitness Olympia - 2nd
2000 Fitness Olympia - 3rd
2000 IFBB Jan Tana Classic Pro Fitness-Overall
1999 IFBB Fitness Olympia - 9th
1999 IFBB Midwest Pro Fitness Classic - 1st
1999 IFBB Italian Pro Fitness Classic - 6th
1999 IFBB Jan Tana Pro Fitness Classic - 2nd
1998 IFBB Fitness Olympia - 10th place
1998 IFBB Midwest Pro Fitness - 2nd place
1998 IFBB Jan Tana Pro Fitness - 6th place
1998 NPC USA Fitness Championships - Overall Short Class (IFBB Professional Qualifier)
1998 NPC Florida State Fitness Championships - Overall
1997 3rd Annual NPC Debbie Kruck Fitness Classic - Overall
1997 NPC Team Universe Fitness Championships - 5th place
1997 NPC Women's National Fitness Championships - 14th place
1996 NPC Southern USA Fitness Championships - Overall
1996 NPC Tallahassee Fitness Championships - Overall
1996 NPC Junior National Fitness Championships - 2nd place
1996 2nd Annual NPC Debbie Kruck Fitness Classic - 3rd place
1996 NPC Women's National Fitness Championships - 14th place

References 

 Jenny Worth's profile on Bodybuilders.com
 Website
http://www.getbig.com/pics/fitness/w/worth.htm
http://www.getbig.com/pics/olympia/2002/olympia2002.htm

Fitness and figure competitors
Living people
1977 births